Walraven II van Brederode (8 January 1462 – 14 January 1531) was Lord of Brederode, Vianen, Ameide, Bailiff of Hagestein and Burgrave of Utrecht.

Life
He was the son of Reinoud II van Brederode and Yolanda de Lalaing. When he was three years old his father named him Bailiff of Hagestein. Just like his father Reinoud II and his uncle Gijsbrecht van Brederode, he was captured by Bishop David of Burgundy in 1470, but he managed to escape with some assistance and fled to Castle Batenstein. On 16 October 1473 he succeeded his father as the 10th Lord of Brederode. Walraven's succession ceremony was interrupted by his half-brothers, who were illegitimate however, leaving Walraven as the rightful successor. In 1486 he was knighted by Maximilian of Austria, and took a place in Maximilian's council. After the death of Maximilian, Walraven searched for a way to reinstate the rule of the Hook faction, which would lead to a new war. After several years, Walraven defected to the opposing faction, which would prove to be a good decision.

Family

Walraven married firstly with the non-noble Geertruida van Alphen, and had several bastard children with her, who would later make claims to the lordship of Brederode. In 1492 Walraven married the noble Margaretha van Kloetinge van Borselen. She died in 1507, after which he married Anna van Nieuwenaar on 11 May 1508.

Walraven had the following children with Geertruida van Alphen:
 Reinoud (bastard) van Brederode
 unknown (bastard) van Brederode
 Jan (bastard) van Brederode

Walraven had the following children with Magretha van Kloetinge van Borselen:
 Reinoud III van Brederode 1492–1556
 Francisca van Brederode  1500–1553
 Wolfert van Brederode  ????–1548
 Françoise van Brederode  ????–1553
 Charlotte van Brederode  1495–1529

Walraven had the following children with Anna van Nieuwenaar:
 Walburga van Brederode  1512–1567, grandmother of the sisters Armgard, Countess of Rietberg, and Walburgis, Countess of Rietberg;
 Frans van Brederode    1512–1529
 Margaretha van Brederode  1514–1577
 Yolande van Brederode  1515–1525
 Balthazar van Brederode  1516–1576
 Yolande van Brederode  1525–1553
 Maria van Brederode
 Reinoud van Brederode  ????–1549

External links 
 Biography from the Nieuw Nederlandsch biografisch woordenboek. Part 10 (1937) (Dutch)

1462 births
1531 deaths
Dutch nobility
Walraven 02